Virginia Black is a brand of American Bourbon whiskey.

History 

Virginia Black is a collaboration between Brent Hocking and Drake. It is distributed in the United States by Proximo Spirits and is available in Canada, the U.K., Ghana, Kenya, Rwanda, Tanzania, Zanzibar, Burundi, Uganda, and United Arab Emirates. It is also available in Australia. 

Virginia Black made headlines for its record-breaking debut at the Liquor Control Board of Ontario (LCBO) in Ontario, Canada. Virginia Black sold a record 1,779 bottles on the day it was released and went on to sell 4,650 bottles in its first week. It also sold 30,000 cases in its first year.

Production

Virginia Black is a "personally selected collection of two, three, and four-year old Bourbon Whiskey focused on a high-rye content and finished with a decadent profile."  It 40% ABV (80 proof).

Awards 
 Wine Enthusiast: Top 100 Spirits of 2017
  Wine Enthusiast: Awarded 91 points

References

External links  

 Official website

Bourbon whiskey